Ravan Baku is an Azerbaijani professional football club based in Baku.

This list encompasses the major records set by the club and their players in the Azerbaijan Premier League. The player records section includes details of the club's goalscorers and those who have made more than 50 appearances in first-team competitions.

Player

Most appearances 

Players played over 50 competitive, professional matches only. Appearances as substitute (goals in parentheses) included in total.

Overall scorers 
 
Competitive, professional matches only, appearances including substitutes appear in brackets.

Team

Record wins
Record win: 6–2 v Turan Tovuz, 2012-13 Azerbaijan Premier League, 30 March 2013
Record League win: 6–2 v Turan Tovuz, 2012-13 Azerbaijan Premier League, 30 March 2013
Record Azerbaijan Cup win: 5–2 v Qaradağ, 4 December 2013
Record away win: 6–2 v Turan Tovuz, 2012-13 Azerbaijan Premier League, 30 March 2013
Record home win 5–1 v Kəpəz, 2011-12 Azerbaijan Premier League, 28 April 2012

Record defeats
Record defeat: 0–5
v Baku, 2013-14 Azerbaijan Premier League, 18 August 2013
Record League defeat: 0–4
v Baku, 2013-14 Azerbaijan Premier League, 18 August 2013
Record away defeat: 0–5
v Baku, 2013-14 Azerbaijan Premier League, 18 August 2013
Record Azerbaijan Cup defeat: 0–5
v Khazar Lankaran, Quarterfinals 2nd leg, 7 March 2013
Record home defeat: 3–5
v AZAL, Azerbaijan Premier League, 14 May 2013

Goals
 Most Premier League goals scored in a season: 46 – 2012–13
 Fewest League goals scored in a season: 30 – 2013-14
 Most League goals conceded in a season: 53 – 2012–13
 Fewest League goals conceded in a season: 22 – 2013-14

Points
 Most points in a season:
41 in 32 matches, Azerbaijan Premier League, 2011–12
 Fewest points in a season:
22 in 38 matches, Azerbaijan Premier League, 2013–14

International representatives

Current Ravan players

Former Ravan players

References

Ravan Baku FK
Ravan Baku FC